This is a list of museums in Paraguay.

 Casa de la Independencia Museum
 Botanical Garden and Zoo of Asunción (museum of natural history and indigenous culture)
 Museo Nacional de Bellas Artes de Asunción
 Mythical Museum Ramón Elías
 Gaspar Rodríguez de Francia Museum
 Museo Militar (Asunción, Paraguay)
 Museo Memoria de la Ciudad
 Museo del Barro
 Museo de Arte Sacro de la Fundación Nicolás Darío Latourrette Bo
 Museo Etnográfico Doctor Andrés Barbero
 Museo Mitológico Ramón Elías
 Museo San Rafael (Itaguá, Paraguay)

See also 
 List of museums by country

Paraguay
 
Museums
Paraguay
Museums